Africa's Out! is a charitable organization located in Brooklyn, New York, United States, founded by artist and activist Wangechi Mutu in 2014. The group's stated mission is to honor, support and defend artists who change the narrative around Africa and its diaspora. Africa's Out! uses artists and the creative community from within Africa and its diaspora, to highlight the urgency of social and political issues through creative platforms. The organization stated grant-making is to "advance change through the power of art and activism, particularly supporting artists, initiatives and institutions from Africa and its Diaspora that celebrate freedom of creative expression".  

Africa's Out!’s artist residency program supports emerging and mid-career artists from the African diaspora whose work speaks to a social and political engagement with Africa. The selected artists benefit from the space to create and the exposure to the contemporary art conversations and relationships that Africa's Out! offers. This brings the artist in residence's perspective into conversation with more established artists, curators, and collectors in the New York City art community. In partnership with Denniston Hill, an artist residency in upstate New York, founded by artists including Julie Mehretu, Paul Pfeiffer, and Lawrence Chua, Africa's Out! has awarded Michael Soi (2016) and Lerato Shadi (2017) residency grants.

Africa's Out! has funded programming at the Brooklyn Museum, Afropunk Festival, Studio Museum in Harlem and NeueHouse.

In 2016 Africa's Out! supported Shapeshifters and Vogue Ball at the Brooklyn Museum first Saturdays. Presenters at this event were Afripedia, Daapo Reo, Tavia Nyong'o, Teddy Goitom, and Senay Berhe.

References

External links
 

LGBT culture in Africa